Taraje Williams-Murray (born November 9 1984, in Bronx, New York) is an American Judoka.  He graduated from high school at the age of 15 and went to college.  After an initial health scare where he was diagnosed with beta thalassemia, Taraje was able to continue to compete at a high level. He competed in the Beijing Olympics at the age of 23, as well as the Athens Olympics at the age of 19 for Team USA.

References

Living people
Olympic judoka of the United States
American male judoka
1984 births
Judoka at the 2004 Summer Olympics
Judoka at the 2008 Summer Olympics